Wirt is a town in Allegany County, New York, United States. The population was 1,059 at the 2020 census. The town is in the southwest part of the county and east of Olean.

History 

The area that would become the town was first settled circa 1812. The town of Wirt was created in 1838 from parts of the towns of Bolivar and Friendship.

Geography

New York State Route 275 is a major north-south highway through the town.

Demographics

As of the census of 2000, there were 1,215 people, 446 households, and 323 families residing in the town.  The population density was 33.8 people per square mile (13.1/km2).  There were 669 housing units at an average density of 18.6 per square mile (7.2/km2).  The racial makeup of the town was 97.94% White, 0.33% Black or African American, 0.08% Native American, 0.25% Asian, none Pacific Islander, 0.49% from other races, and 0.91% from two or more races.  None of the population are Hispanic or Latino of any race.

There were 446 households, out of which 33.6% had children under the age of 18 living with them, 56.7% were married couples living together, 9.6% had a female householder with no husband present, and 27.4% were non-families. 23.3% of all households were made up of individuals, and 11.0% had someone living alone who was 65 years of age or older.  The average household size was 2.72 and the average family size was 3.13.

In the town, the population was spread out, with 30.5% under the age of 18, 7.1% from 18 to 24, 27.3% from 25 to 44, 22.4% from 45 to 64, and 12.7% who were 65 years of age or older.  The median age was 35 years. For every 100 females, there were 99.5 males.  For every 100 females age 18 and over, there were 101.9 males.

The median income for a household in the town was $28,456, and the median income for a family was $32,222. Males had a median income of $27,321 versus $23,958 for females. The per capita income for the town was $12,387.  About 12.3% of families and 14.8% of the population were below the poverty line, including 17.4% of those under age 18 and 6.1% of those age 65 or over.

Communities and locations in the Town of Wirt 
Inavale – A location on the east town line.
Richburg – Part of the village of Richburg is at the south town line.
West Notch – A hamlet south of Wirt hamlet on County Road 34 (West Notch Road).
Wirt – A hamlet located on County Road 34 (West Notch Road and Evans Street) north of Richburg.

References

Towns in New York (state)
Towns in Allegany County, New York